Howse Pass (el. ) is a pass through the Rocky Mountains in Canada.
The pass is located in Banff National Park, between Mount Conway and Howse Peak. From here waters flow east via Conway Creek, Howse River, North Saskatchewan River to Lake Winnipeg and Hudson Bay. To the west it drains by the Blaeberry River to the Columbia River and on to the Pacific Ocean.

The pass was used by First Nations people such as the Kootenay to the west and Peigan to the east. In 1806 two men from Rocky Mountain House cut a rough road from the Howse River toward the pass. In June 1807 David Thompson crossed it to the Columbia River. It was named for Joseph Howse, a Hudson's Bay Company factor who crossed it later, in 1809. The pass was not much used, Athabasca Pass being preferred.

Howse Pass is lower than many other passes in this range and it was considered for the Canadian Pacific's route, but Kicking Horse Pass was chosen instead. There has been some talk of building a road through the pass from Saskatchewan River Crossing to Golden, British Columbia, but this would involve cutting through the national park.

The pass was designated a National Historic Site of Canada in 1978.

See also

 List of Rocky Mountain passes on the continental divide

References

External links

 The Vanishing Trail - The Great Divide Trail Association
 Parks Canada - Howse Pass National Historic Site

Banff National Park
Mountain passes of Alberta
Mountain passes of British Columbia
National Historic Sites in Alberta
National Historic Sites in British Columbia